Andrew Lewis (born in Sutton-in-Ashfield, Nottinghamshire on 14 May 1963) is a British composer known mainly for his acousmatic music, that is, electroacoustic music heard only over loudspeakers, though he also composes some chamber and orchestral music.

Education
He studied music at the University of Birmingham in England, first as an undergraduate (1981–84), then as a postgraduate studying composition with Jonty Harrison. It was during this time that he became one of the original members of BEAST, performing electroacoustic music throughout the United Kingdom under Harrison's direction. After gaining a PhD in 1992 he worked briefly in the Music department at the University of Surrey (England) (1992–93) before becoming lecturer at the Bangor University (Wales). He is currently a Professor of music there, as well as directing the work of the Electroacoustic Music Studios and Electroacoustic WALES, which performs electroacoustic and acousmatic music.

Music
Much of his acousmatic music displays an interest in the abstraction of unseen and unrecognisable sounds, an approach particularly strongly evident in earlier works such as Arrivals (1987) and Time and Fire (1991). However, with the composition of Scherzo (1992) a parallel concern with the anecdotal and pictorial possibilities of recognisable sounds began to emerge, and much of his subsequent work plays on the tensions between these two approaches. Since moving to Wales, much of the evocation of image in his music relates to the landscape of the area in which he lives and works. Ascent (1994) evokes the wildness of the mountain landscape of Snowdonia, which was awarded a ‘Euphonie d’Or’ by the Bourges electroacoustic music competition, as one of the most notable former prizewinning works between 1975 and 2005. More recently the cycle of works Four Anglesey Beaches (1999-2003) takes as its inspiration the seascapes and coastal locations of the area.

Although very little music exists for conventional forces, there have been a few notable exceptions in recent years: Eclipse (orchestra, 2004) was premiered under Elgar Howarth in 2004, while in the same year Tempo Reale (string quartet, 2004) was chosen by Sir Peter Maxwell Davies for a performance in London's Wigmore Hall.

A handful of writings on the analysis of electroacoustic music also exist, in particular ‘Francis Dhomont’s Novars’, Journal of New Music Research, Vol. 27 (1998), No. 1–2, pp. 67–83.

Works 
The Song of Five Anger, acousmatic (1982)
Empire canons, two trumpets (1982)
Logos, acousmatic (1983)
Quad, four clarinets (1983)
Sonnerie aux morts, acousmatic (1984)
La Corona, ensemble (1984)
Adagio, acousmatic (1985)
Rond'eau, acousmatic (1985)
FM, music theatre for solo guitarist (1985)
Principles of Flight, shakuhachi and electroacoustic sounds (1986, rev. 1991) 
MARanaTHA, four amplified voices and live electronics (1986)
Storm-song, piano and electroacoustic sounds (1987)
Arrivals, acousmatic (1987)
...a cord of three strands..., ensemble, computer and live electronics (1988)
Time and Fire, acousmatic (1990) 
Changes, flute, viola and harp (1990)
Tracking, piano trio (1990)
int/EXT, harpsichord and electroacoustic sounds (1991)
PulseRates (with BEAST), acousmatic (1991) 
Scherzo, acousmatic (1992, revised 1993) 
Ascent, acousmatic (1994, revised 1997)
Eclipse, orchestra (1996, rev. 2004)
môr(G)wyn, acousmatic (1996)
Cân, acousmatic (1997)
Nunc dimittis, boys' choir and organ (1998)
Cable Bay, acousmatic (1999)
CHROMA - Thema, flute (alto flute), oboe, horn, trombone, viola, harp (1999)
Shadow Play, small orchestra (1999)
Tempo Reale, string quartet (1999, rev. 2004)
Dawns, harp and electroacoustic sounds (2000)
Jeux d'ombres, flute, oboe, clarinet, bassoon and piano (2000)
double (fragment), 2fl, 2ob, 2clt (2bcl), hn, 2pno, 2vln, vla, vlc, elec bs (2001)
double (serenâd), 2 ob, 2 cl, 2 basset hn, 2 bsn, 4 hn, cb (2002)
Penmon Point, acousmatic (2003)
Llanddwyn Skies, acousmatic (2003)
Benllech Shells, acousmatic (2003)
'Budo' Variations, trumpet, percussion and computer (2006)
Danses acousmatiques, acousmatic (2007)
Schattenklavier, piano and computer (2009)
X-over, piano or toy piano (2009)
Number Nine Dream, orchestra (2010)
Vox Populi, interactive installation (2011)
Vox Dei, 8 amplified voices and live processing (2011)
Dark Glass, acousmatic (2011)
Tantana, acousmatic (2011)
Air, bassoon and computer (2012)
Lexicon, acousmatic with video (2012)
Il re lunaire, fl, cl, vl, vc, vib, pno (2013)

References 
Computer Music Journal, Vol 24 Issue 1 (MIT Press), Austin L., 'Review, 29th Festival International des Musiques et Créations Electroniques 
28 May-6 June 1999, Bourges, France'
‘Francis Dhomont’s Novars’, Journal of New Music Research, Vol. 27 (1998), No. 1–2, pp. 67–83
Roy S., 'L’analyse des musiques electroacoustiques: modeles et propositions' (L’Harmattan, Paris, January 2004)

External links 
Sonic Arts Research Archive 
Lewis's staff page at the University of Wales Bangor

1963 births
Living people
English composers
People from Sutton-in-Ashfield
Musicians from Nottinghamshire
Academics of the University of Surrey
Academics of Bangor University
Alumni of the University of Birmingham